John Hutton (10 January 1847 – 19 December 1921) was a British Conservative politician who was a Member of Parliament in the House of Commons in two periods between 1868 and 1906.

Hutton was the son of John Hutton of Sowber Hill and his wife Caroline Robson, daughter of Thomas Robson of Holtby Hall, Yorkshire. He was educated at Eton College and Christ Church, Oxford. He was a lieutenant in the North York Militia and a J.P. for the North Riding of Yorkshire.

At the 1868 general election, Hutton was elected Member of Parliament for Northallerton. He held the seat until 1874. At the 1895 general election, Hutton was elected MP  for Richmond, Yorkshire. He held the seat until 1906.

Hutton died at the age of 74.

References

External links
 

1847 births
1921 deaths
People educated at Eton College
Conservative Party (UK) MPs for English constituencies
UK MPs 1868–1874
UK MPs 1895–1900
UK MPs 1900–1906
Alumni of Christ Church, Oxford